Syringa is an unincorporated community in Middlesex County, Virginia, United States. Syringa had a post office, which closed on September 3, 1988.

Education
Syringa High School. Closed in 1950 with the creation of Middlesex High School. The auditorium of the school built circa 1936 is now the Freeshade Community Center.

References

Unincorporated communities in Middlesex County, Virginia
Unincorporated communities in Virginia